Dil Jo Bhi Kahey... is a 2005 Indian Hindi-language romantic drama film directed by Romesh Sharma. Amitabh Bachchan, Revathi Nair, Karan Sharma, Bhumika Chawla, Annabelle Wallis, Malcolm Stoddard and Claire Oberman star in the film. It is the first and only movie starring Karan Sharma, who is also the director's son. The film is adapted from Romesh Sharma's Mauritian serial titled C'est La Vie (Mauritian TV Series), also featuring Karan Sharma and was broadcast on Mauritius Broadcasting Corporation in Mauritius in 2003.

Plot 
Shekhar Sinha, his wife Sandhaya and their son Jai  are one of the many Hindu Indo-Mauritian families living in Mauritius.
Jai ventures out to Stockholm, Sweden to obtain an education in culinary studies and incidentally meets Sophie Besson, a Roman Catholic Franco-Mauritian. They start meeting regularly and soon fall in love. Jai is introduced to Sophie's parents, Norman and Claire Besson. Norman (a large land owner in Mauritius)  instantly disapproves of him (because of his ethnicity). Jai feels his father and mother would approve of Sophie. Unfortunately Sandhaya disapproves her (because of her Catholic faith) and tells Jai to end his relationship with her.
The lovers plan to elope but Jai fails to turn up on the stipulated wedding time in Church. Sophie reluctantly returns to her parents to marry the boy of their choice (Gordon). By this time Jai is engaged to Gayatri Pandey, to fulfill his mother's wish (who has asthma). Sophie wants to know why Jai did not turn up. Meanwhile, Gayatri learns of Jai and Sophie's love and comes up with a ruse of Sophie's false pregnancy that forces Sophie and Jai's family to accept them as a couple. The film ends with Gayatri leaving Mauritius.

Cast 
 Amitabh Bachchan as Shekhar Sinha
 Revathi Nair as Sandhaya Sinha
 Karan Sharma as Jai Sinha
 Bhumika Chawla as Gayatri Pandey
 Annabelle Wallis as Sophie Besson
 Malcolm Stoddard as Norman Besson
 Claire Oberman as Claire Besson
 Manuj Tilakraj Gulati as Gaurav Gulati

Music

References

External links
 
 
 Details at Yahoo! movies

2005 films
2000s Hindi-language films
Indian romantic musical films
Films scored by Shankar–Ehsaan–Loy
Films set in Mauritius
Films set in Sweden
Films shot in Sweden
Films shot in Mauritius